Hofu Plant is an automobile manufacturing complex in Hōfu, Yamaguchi, Japan operated by Mazda Motor Corporation.  The complex consists of two main elements, an automobile assembly complex in Nishinoura District, and a transmission plant in nearby Nakanoseki District. It was the second plant opened to support operations at the original Hiroshima Plant.

Nishinoura
Nishinoura has two main factories, known as "H1" and "H2". Together they include approximately 947,224 square yards, (792,000 square meters), of space.

H1
H1 was opened in September 1982.

Current products:
 Mazda Demio/Mazda2
 Mazda Axela/Mazda3
 Mazda CX-3

Previous products:
 Mazda Familia/323/Protegé
 Mazda MX-3

H2
H2 was opened in February 1992.

Current products:
 Mazda Atenza/Mazda6
 Mazda CX-5
Past products:
 Mazda Capella/626
 2001–2006 Mazda Tribute
 2001–2006 Ford Escape

Nakanoseki
Nakanoseki opened in December 1981 and includes 537,000 square meters of space.  It produces automatic and manual transmissions.  The company announced that transmission production had reached 25 million units as of September 2006.  This milestone took 24 years and nine months to attain.

See also
 List of Mazda facilities

References

 
Mazda Factory locations Japan

External links
Mazda: Activities in Japan

Mazda factories
Motor vehicle assembly plants in Japan
Buildings and structures in Yamaguchi Prefecture
Hōfu, Yamaguchi